This is a list of the States of India ranked in order of percentage of people exposed to the media. This information was compiled from NFHS-4. National Family Health Survey (NFHS) is a large-scale, multi round survey conducted by the International Institute of Population Sciences (IIPS), Mumbai designated by the Ministry of Health and Family Welfare (MOHFW), Government of India. National Family Health Survey (NFHS-4) was based on year 2015-16 and the detailed survey can be viewed in the following website.

List

References

 https://web.archive.org/web/20071214051628/http://www.nfhsindia.org/

Demographics of India
Lists of mass media in India
Influence of mass media
Lists of subdivisions of India